Coralie Fargeat (born 1976) is a French film director and screenwriter. She is best known for her 2017 debut feature film Revenge.

Early life
Fargeat was born and raised in Paris. She decided to be a filmmaker when she was 16 or 17 years old. Fargeat studied at the Paris Institute of Political Studies before beginning work on film sets. She later completed a year-long director's workshop for continuing education at La Fémis, a prestigious cinema school in Paris.

Fargeat lists David Cronenberg, John Carpenter, David Lynch, and Michael Haneke as filmmakers who have influenced her.

Career 

Fargeat's first short film Le télégramme was released in 2003, a film about two women awaiting a postman's delivery during World War II. The film won 13 awards at several film festivals.

In 2007, Fargeat co-created Les Fées cloches [fr] with Anne-Elisabeth Blateaur, a comedy mini-series which she also directed.

Fargeat released her short follow-up Reality+ in 2014. The sci-fi tale received a nomination for the Jury Award at the Tribeca Film Festival.

Fargeat's debut feature film was Revenge, a feminist revenge thriller about a young woman assaulted and left for dead. The film had its world premiere at the 2017 Toronto International Film Festival in the festival's Midnight Madness section, and was selected to be screened at 23 additional film festivals.

Fargeat is a member and one of the founding signatories of Collectif 50/50, a group established with the purpose of working towards gender equality across the film industry.

In February 2022, it was reported that Fargeat's next feature film will be The Substance, a feminist body horror film written by Fargeat and produced by Universal Pictures and Working Title Films. Production of the film, which stars Demi Moore, Margaret Qualley, and Ray Liotta, began in May 2022.

Fargeat also directed an episode of the Netflix series The Sandman.

Filmography

Awards and nominations

See also
Revenge (2017 film)

References

Further reading 

 "Coralie Fargeat Essay". Cut-Throat Women.
 Crucchiola, Jordan; Fargeat, Coralie (2020-04-17). "A French Director Fears Parisians Aren't Taking the Coronavirus Seriously". Vulture.
 "Director Coralie Fargeat Talks Obsession, Inspirations, and 'Revenge'". Film School Rejects. 2018-09-18.
 Fleming, Amy (2018-05-10). "'Revenge' director Coralie Fargeat on her gory riposte to the male gaze". Financial Times.
 Posada, Tim. "Male Hysteria and the New Final Girl in 2018's Revenge." Performing Hysteria (2020): 189-203.
 "Rencontre avec Coralie Fargeat, la réalisatrice du très énervé Revenge". EcranLarge.com (in French). 2018-02-11.

External links 
 

Film directors from Paris
Sciences Po alumni
French women screenwriters
21st-century French women writers
Writers from Paris
French women film directors
1976 births
Living people